18th Annual GLAAD Media Awards (2007) were presented at four separate ceremonies: March 26 in New York City; April 14 in Los Angeles; April 28 in San Francisco; and May 10 in Miami. The awards were presented to honor "fair, accurate and inclusive" representations of gay individuals in the media.

Special recognition
 Excellence in Media Award: Patti LaBelle
 Vito Russo Award: Tom Ford
 Vanguard Award: Jennifer Aniston
 Stephen F. Kolzak Award: Martina Navratilova
 Visibilidad Award: Jaime Bayly
 Davidson/Valentini Award: Robert Gant
 Pioneer Award: Kate Clinton
 Pioneer Award: Phyllis Lyon and Del Martin
 Special Recognition: The Colbert Report

Award Nominees
(winners are bolded)

Film
 OUTSTANDING FILM – WIDE RELEASE
 Little Miss Sunshine (Fox Searchlight Pictures)
 The Night Listener (Miramax Films)
 Running with Scissors (TriStar Pictures)
 Talladega Nights: The Ballad of Ricky Bobby (Columbia Pictures)
 V for Vendetta (Warner Bros. Pictures)
 OUTSTANDING FILM – LIMITED RELEASE
 The History Boys (Fox Searchlight Pictures)
 Imagine Me & You (Fox Searchlight Pictures)
 Quinceañera (Sony Pictures Classics)
 Shortbus (THINKFilm)
 Summer Storm (Regent Releasing)

Television
 OUTSTANDING DRAMA SERIES
 Brothers & Sisters (ABC)
 The L Word (Showtime)
 Hex (BBC America)
 The Sopranos (HBO)
 South of Nowhere (The N)
 OUTSTANDING COMEDY SERIES
 Desperate Housewives (ABC)
 The Office (NBC)
 So NoTORIous (VH1)
 Ugly Betty (ABC)
 OUTSTANDING INDIVIDUAL EPISODE (in a series without a regular gay character)
 "Blind Date" - 30 Rock (NBC)
 "Forever Blue" - Cold Case (CBS)
 "Lincoln Lover" - American Dad! (Fox)
 "Single Stamina" - How I Met Your Mother (CBS)
 "Where the Boys Are" - Grey's Anatomy (ABC)
 OUTSTANDING TELEVISION MOVIE OR MINI-SERIES
 A Girl Like Me: The Gwen Araujo Story (Lifetime)
 Wedding Wars (A&E)
 OUTSTANDING DOCUMENTARY
 All Aboard! Rosie's Family Cruise (HBO)
 Billie Jean King: Portrait of a Pioneer (HBO)
 My Mums Used to be Men (BBC America)
 One Punk Under God (Sundance Channel)
 This Film is Not Yet Rated (IFC Films)
 OUTSTANDING REALITY PROGRAM
 The Amazing Race 10 (CBS)
 Big Brother: All-Stars (CBS)
 Project Runway (Bravo)
 Queer Eye (Bravo)
 Work Out (Bravo)
 OUTSTANDING DAILY DRAMA
 All My Children (ABC)
 As the World Turns (CBS)
 General Hospital (ABC)
 Passions (NBC)
 OUTSTANDING TALK SHOW EPISODE
 "Hate Crimes" - The Tyra Banks Show
 "The Murder of a Boy Named Gwen" - The Montel Williams Show
 "Transgender: A Struggle for Acceptance" - The Montel Williams Show
 "Transsexuals" - The Tyra Banks Show
 "Wives Confess They are Gay" - The Oprah Winfrey Show
 OUTSTANDING TV JOURNALISM – NEWSMAGAZINE
 "Forbidden Love" - Nightline (ABC)
 "Lesbians in the Ministry" - To the Contrary (PBS)
 "Transgender People" - The Big Idea with Donny Deutsch (CNBC)
 "Under the Rainbow" - NOW (PBS)
 "Will Gay Debate Tear Church Apart?" - Larry King Live (CNN)
 OUTSTANDING TV JOURNALISM – NEWS SEGMENT
 "The Equality Ride" - MTV News: The Amazing Break (MTV)
 "Military Expulsion" - Good Morning America Weekend (ABC)
 "Same-Sex Marriage" - Live From… (CNN)
 "Secret Love: Gay Life in the Middle East" - Inside the Middle East (CNN)
 "Transgender Teen" - Paula Zahn Now (CNN)

Print
 OUTSTANDING NEWSPAPER ARTICLE
 "Even Deep in Dixie, Gays Sense Inexorable Shift Toward Acceptance" by David Crary (Associated Press)
 "Fathers in the Making" by Kevin Sack (Los Angeles Times)
 "Gay Teens Are Using the System" by Seema Mehta (Los Angeles Times)
 "Hill Republicans Air Out the Closet" by Jose Antonio Vargas (The Washington Post)
 "Supporting Boys or Girls When the Line Isn't Clear" by Patricia Leigh Brown (The New York Times)
 OUTSTANDING NEWSPAPER COLUMNIST
 Alfred Doblin (Herald News, Bergen, NJ)
 Dana Milbank (The Washington Post)
 Deb Price (The Detroit News)
 Frank Rich (The New York Times)
 Dan Savage (The New York Times)
 OUTSTANDING NEWSPAPER OVERALL COVERAGE
 The Boston Globe
 The Daily Press (Newport News, Virginia)
 The Honolulu Advertiser
 Los Angeles Times
 USA Today
 OUTSTANDING MAGAZINE ARTICLE
 "I am Woman" by D. Cookie Fields as told to Michelle Burford (Essence)
 "The Out Crowd" by Jason Newman (Urb)
 "The Pressure to Cover" by Kenji Yoshino (The New York Times Magazine)
 "Queer Inc." by Marc Gunther (Fortune)
 "What if it's (Sort of) a Boy and (Sort of) a Girl?" by Elizabeth Weil (The New York Times Magazine)
 OUTSTANDING MAGAZINE OVERALL COVERAGE
 AsianWeek
 The Chronicle of Higher Education
 CosmoGIRL!
 Details
 People
 OUTSTANDING DIGITAL JOURNALISM ARTICLE
 "BV Q&A with Julian Bond: Why this Civil Rights Icon Embraces Gay Rights" by Angela Bronner (BlackVoices.aol.com)
 "The Glass Closet" by Alex Koppelman (Salon.com)
 "Homosexual and 'Passionate About Islam'" by Jennifer Carlile (MSNBC.com)
 "How Many Strikes?" by Erin Marie Daly (IntheFray.com)
 "Is Fear the Best Way to Fight AIDS?" by Kai Wright (TheNation.com)
 OUTSTANDING DIGITAL JOURNALISM – MULTIMEDIA
 "AIDS at 25: A Multimedia Perspective" (Newsweek.com)
 "Being a Gay Black Man" by Ben de la Cruz, Pierre Kattar, and Sholnn Z. Freeman (WashingtonPost.com)
 "Mookey's Story" by Carolyn Goossen, Daffodil Altan, and Min Lee (NewAmericaMedia.org)
 OUTSTANDING COMIC BOOK
 52 by Geoff Johns, Grant Morrison, Greg Rucka, Mark Waid (DC Comics)
 American Virgin by Steven T. Seagle (Vertigo/DC Comics)
 Fun Home by Alison Bechdel (Houghton Mifflin)
 Manhunter by Marc Andreyko (DC Comics)
 Y: The Last Man by Brian K. Vaughn (Vertigo/DC Comics)
 OUTSTANDING ADVERTISING – ELECTRONIC
 "Bad Weather" - Orbitz
 "Ejection" - United Church of Christ
 "Gangster of Love" - Axe Clix
 "Living Room" - IKEA
 OUTSTANDING ADVERTISING – PRINT
 "Bear" - Marc Jacobs
 "Gay by God" - Rehoboth Temple Christ Conscious Church
 "Jack/Jack" - Paris Las Vegas
 "Madame President" - Svedka Vodka
 "Suits" - Paris Las Vegas

Music & Theater
 OUTSTANDING MUSIC ARTIST
 The Ditty Bops, Moon Over the Freeway
 Final Fantasy, He Poos Clouds
 Peaches, Impeach My Bush
 Pet Shop Boys, Fundamental
 Scissor Sisters, Ta-Dah
 OUTSTANDING LOS ANGELES THEATER
 Bluebonnet Court, by Zsa Zsa Gershick
 Doubt, by John Patrick Shanley
 A Man of No Importance, book by Terrence McNally, music by Stephen Flaherty, lyrics by Lynn Ahrens
 Matthew Bourne's Swan Lake, by Matthew Bourne, music by Peter Ilyich Tchaikovsky
 Play it Cool, book by Larry Dean Harris, music by Phillip Swann, lyrics by Mark Winkler
 OUTSTANDING NEW YORK THEATER: BROADWAY & OFF–BROADWAY
 25 Questions for a Jewish Mother by Kate Moira Ryan with Judy Gold
 The History Boys by Alan Bennett
 The Little Dog Laughed by Douglas Carter Beane
 Measure for Pleasure by David Grimm
 [title of show] by Jeff Bowen and Hunter Bell
 OUTSTANDING NEW YORK THEATER: OFF–OFF BROADWAY
 33 to Nothing by Grant James Varjas
 Candy and Dorothy by David Johnston
 Dina Martina: Sedentary Lady by Grady West
 Kiss and Cry by Tom Rowan
 Sinner by Ben Payne

External links
 18th Annual GLAAD Media Awards official site
 Complete list of nominees
 Logo - 18th Annual GLAAD Media Awards
 GLAAD Official Site

References

18th
2007 awards
2007 in LGBT history
Lists of LGBT-related award winners and nominees